The Abode of Life is a Star Trek: The Original Series novel written by Lee Correy.  "Lee Correy" was the pseudonym of G. Harry Stine, who was a science and technology writer as well as one of the founding figures of model rocketry.

Plot
The citizens of the isolated planet Mercan cannot conceive of the existence of much past their home planet and their dangerous, flaring sun.

The USS Enterprise, severely damaged, must somehow find a way to repair itself without exposing the Mercanians to societal concepts for which they are not yet ready, as the Federation's 'Prime Directive' forbids interference in less advanced cultures.

References

External links

1982 American novels
American science fiction novels
Novels based on Star Trek: The Original Series
Novels set in the 23rd century